Bibek Bhowmik is a former Indian footballer who is currently the manager for ONGC in the I-League.

Coaching career

ONGC
After ONGC F.C. won promotion to the I-League after finishing in 2nd place in the 2012 I-League 2nd Division Final Round Bhowmik took the helm at ONGC for the 2012-13 I-League. His  first game as manager of ONGC was on 21 September 2012 during the 2012 Indian Federation Cup against Kalighat MS in which ONGC won 5–1. Bhowmik's ONGC however could not reach the semi-finals as they lost to East Bengal F.C. and ended with a victory over Sporting Goa. He then managed his first I-League match on 8 October 2012 against Pune F.C. in which ONGC lost 3–2.

Career statistics

Club
Statistics accurate as of 5 October 2012

References

Indian footballers
Living people
Footballers from West Bengal
I-League managers
Association footballers not categorized by position
Year of birth missing (living people)
Indian football managers